Arsène Vaillant (13 June 1922 – 30 April 2007) was a Belgian footballer. He played in twelve matches for the Belgium national football team from 1944 to 1951.

References

External links
 

1922 births
2007 deaths
Belgian footballers
Belgium international footballers
Place of birth missing
Association footballers not categorized by position